Pavel M. Fradkov is a Russian government official serving as a deputy head of the Presidential Administration of Russia.

Life 
Pavel M. Fradkov is the youngest son of Mikhail Fradkov. He studied law at the FSB Academy with Andrey Patrushev who is the son of Nikolai Patrushev, graduated in 2003, and then attended and graduated from the Diplomatic Academy of the Ministry of Foreign Affairs of the Russian Federation.

In 2005, Fradkov joined the Ministry of Foreign Affairs of Russia as the third secretary in the department of pan-European cooperation. He later worked Federal Security Service overseeing the credit and financial sector. 

In the summer of 2012, upon the invitation of Olga Dergunova, Fradkov joined the Federal Agency for State Property Management the deputy. He oversaw three departments, legal, administrative, and the federal property valuation organization. On May 21, 2015, Vladimir Putin appointed Fradkov as a deputy head of the Presidential Administration of Russia. Fradkov was one of three deputies of the head of the presidential affairs, Alexander Kolpakov.

References 

Living people
Year of birth missing (living people)
Place of birth missing (living people)
21st-century Russian politicians
Fradkov family
Diplomatic Academy of the Ministry of Foreign Affairs of the Russian Federation alumni
Federal Security Service officers